Äijät is a Finnish television series. It first aired on Finnish TV in 2007 and last aired in 2008.

Soundtrack

CD
 Children of Bodom: Are You Dead Yet?
 Kalmah: Defeat
 Collarbone: The Last Call
 Eternal Tears of Sorrow: Sakura No Rei
 Ensiferum: Deathbringer from the Sky
 Naildown: Silent Fall
 Noumena: Misanthropolis
 Entwine: My Serenity
 Kalmah: The Groan of Wind
 Sólstafir: Ljósfari
 Finntroll: Nedgång
 Twilightning: Vice Jesus
 Swallow the Sun: Hope
 Amoral: Leave Your Dead Behind
 myGRAIN: Pitch-Black
 April: Stain
 Ensiferum: Ad Victoriam

TV series tracks, not on album 
 Kalmah: Man of the King
 Amoral: Apocalyptic Sci-Fi Fun
 Noumena: Fire and Water
 Nightwish: The Islander
 Nightwish: 7 Days to the Wolves
 Twilight Guardians: Out of Our Hands
 Machinae Supremacy: Edge and Pearl
 Machinae Supremacy: Dark City

See also
List of Finnish television series

External links
 

Finnish television shows
2007 Finnish television series debuts
2008 Finnish television series endings
2000s Finnish television series
Sub (TV channel) original programming